Uffe Eskild Markussen (born September 19, 1952, Frederikshavn) is a Danish jazz reedist, who plays primarily tenor saxophone and bass clarinet.

Markussen was a student at the Royal Danish Academy of Music and played in his early career with an ensemble called Tømmermændene. He co-founded groups with Jorgen Emborg, Jens Winther, and Marilyn Mazur in the late 1970s and early 1980s, and worked with other groups such as Blast, Instant Breakfast, and Santa Cruz. In 1985 he began playing in Niels Jorgen Steen's group A-Team, and founded the six-piece ensemble Orbit the following year. In 1989 he began playing with the Radioens Big Band and in 1991 with Avantgarden Party. Other associations include performing or recording with Frans Bak, Ben Besiakov, Joaquin Chacon, Trine Dansgaard, Pierre Dorge, Kjeld Ipsen, Fredrik Lundin, and Niels-Henning Ørsted Pedersen.

References
Frank Büchmann-Møller, "Uffe Markussen". The New Grove Dictionary of Jazz. 2nd edition, 2001, ed. Barry Kernfeld.

1952 births
Living people
Danish jazz saxophonists
Male saxophonists
Danish jazz clarinetists
21st-century saxophonists
20th-century saxophonists
Royal Danish Academy of Music alumni
21st-century clarinetists
20th-century Danish male musicians
21st-century male musicians
Male jazz musicians